"Things a Man Oughta Know" is a song recorded by American country music singer Lainey Wilson. It was released in August 2020 as the second single from Wilson's Redneck Hollywood EP and would later be included on her 2021 album Sayin' What I'm Thinkin'. The song was written by Wilson, Jason Nix and Jonathan Singleton, and produced by Jay Joyce.

Content
Wilson accepted an interview to Digital Journal, and mentioned she wrote it with Jason Nix and Jonathan Singleton: “We really spoke about all the things that we thought a man oughta know. The list was way too long so we condensed that list. We discussed my childhood and the things that my parents taught me growing up. This song is really about having good character.”

Music video
The music video was released on April 2, 2021, co-directed by Sean O’Halloran and Chris Ashlee. It was shot in Wilson’s own home partially, and filled with personal elements and close friends.

Wilson mentioned in a statement: “I hoped that people would connect to this song and it’s been so incredible to see just how strong the reaction has been. For the music video, we wanted to create a piece of art where people could watch it and feel something all over again.”

Chart performance
The song reached No. 3 on the Hot Country Songs chart, and reached No. 1 on the Country Airplay chart, becoming Wilson's first number-one song.

Charts

Weekly charts

Year-end charts

Certifications

References

2020 singles
2020 songs
Lainey Wilson songs
Songs written by Jonathan Singleton
Song recordings produced by Jay Joyce
BBR Music Group singles